The Eerste Divisie 2010–11 was the 55th season of the Eerste Divisie since its establishment in 1956.

The previous year's winners were De Graafschap, who were replaced by last-placed 2009–10 Eredivisie club RKC Waalwijk. The league featured 18 teams, two fewer than its previous season, following the exclusion of HFC Haarlem from professional football and the relegation of FC Oss to the 2010–11 Topklasse. On May 12, 2010 BV Veendam was declared bankrupt due to financial troubles, with FC Oss consequently expected to be readmitted into Eerste Divisie to replace it; however, the verdict was overturned later in June, and the club was thus allowed to play in the season with a reduced budget.

From this season on, the last-placed team would be relegated to the Topklasse, and replaced by the winner of the newly established third tier.

This season also featured the old Almere-based club FC Omniworld under the new denomination of Almere City FC.

Teams overview

Venues

League table

Results

Playoffs
Excelsior and VVV-Venlo joined the Eerste Divisie-teams for the playoffs, after finishing 16th and 17th in the Eredivisie.

Round 1

Round 2

Round 3

VVV-Venlo and Excelsior will play in 2011–12 Eredivisie.

Top goalscorers
29 goals
  Johan Voskamp (Sparta Rotterdam)

27 goals
  Sjoerd Ars (FC Zwolle)

21 goals
  Melvin Platje (FC Volendam)

20 goals
  Donny de Groot (RKC Waalwijk)
  Michiel Hemmen (AGOVV Apeldoorn)

18 goals
  Derk Boerrigter (RKC Waalwijk)

17 goals
  Fred Benson (RKC Waalwijk)

16 goals
  Koen van der Biezen (Go Ahead Eagles)
  Danny Schreurs (FC Zwolle)

15 goals
  Ruud ter Heide (FC Emmen)
  Marc Höcher (Helmond Sport)

See also
 2010–11 Eredivisie
 2010–11 Topklasse

References

External links
JupilerLeague.nl - Official website Eerste Divisie 
KNVB.nl - Official website KNVB 

Eerste Divisie seasons
2010–11 in Dutch football
Neth